Balıklıova is a small village between Urla and Karaburun, in the Urla district, İzmir Province of Turkey. The meaning of the word Balıklıova comes from a "valley full of fish" (balık, "fish"; ova, "valley"). Particularly during summer time Balıklıova has so many inhabitants. Since majority of households are summer houses, and summer sites. Fishing and agriculture has big importance in the economy of village. Olive, Narcissus and artichoke are major products in the area.

See also
 Sheikh Bedreddin
 Urla
 Karaburun Peninsula
 Flour kurabiye

References

External links
 Photos from Balıklıova area

Fishing communities in Turkey
Villages in Urla District